Dr. Pt. Nandkishore Kapote is a leading senior exponent of Kathak, an Indian classical dance form. He is a senior disciple of Pandit Birju Maharaj. He is the Artistic Director of the Nandkishore Cultural Society. He is also the Director at Dr. D. Y. Patil School of Liberal Arts and Ph.D. guide at Sri Sri Centre for Kathak Research

During the mid-70's Kapote learned the nuances of Kathak in Pune under Kathak Guru Munna Shukla, nephew of Pt. Birju Maharaj. Soon after in 1977–78, Kapote was awarded the National Scholarship from the Cultural Department, Government of India for learning.  He is the first male Kathak performer from all over Maharashtra to receive such a scholarship. He is a recognized Ph.D. guide, mentor and Senior Guru in Kathak dance for Tilak Maharashtra University  and Lalit Kala Kendra, University of Pune.
He is an empaneled artist with Indian Council for Cultural Relations (ICCR).  Dr. Kapote is also an Empaneled Artist of Festival of India (FOI) Abroad with a grading of ‘Outstanding’

In the book Kathak – Indian Classical Dance Art, the author Dr. Sunil Kothari has written – From the younger generation several other dancers deserve mention – they include Nandkishore Kapote.

Institutions & Establishments 
Vimal Bhaskar National Award set up by Nandkishore Cultural Society in the memory of Shrimati Vimal Kapote and Shri Bhaskar Kapote. In 2012, the second Vimal Bhaskar Award was given to Kathak Samrat Padma Vibhushan Pandit Birju Maharaj and Kathak exponent Pandita Saswati Sen at a function at Nandkishore Academy in Nigdi. Award was bestowed upon Dr. Puru Dadheech and Dr. Vibha Dadheech on June 5th, 2022. 

Nritya Samrat Pt. Birju Maharaj National Award set up by Dr. Nandkishore Kapote to pay tribute to the legacy of his Guru Pt. Birju Maharaj.  Award was bestowed upon Dr. Shovana Narayan and Pt. Deepak Maharaj on 14 May 2022. 

For the propagation and education of Kathak classical dance form, Dr. Kapote has instated various establishments, societies and institutions as follows): They also conduct Kathak programmes to provide a platform for students.

Nandkishore Cultural Society at Pune in 1986 (inaugurated by Bharat Ratna Pt. Bhimsen Joshi).
Nandkishore Cultural Society at Nigdi (Pimpri-Chinchwad) in 1998 (inaugurated by doyen of Kathak Padma Vibhushan Pt. Birju Maharaj).
Pt. Birju Maharaj Dance & Music Research Centre & Library in 2006 (in the presence of Pt. Birju Maharaj himself).
Kathak Queen Sitara Devi Art Museum in 2014 (in the presence of Queen of Kathak Sitara Devi).

Advisory Board Member

Dr. Kapote also serves as Honorary Advisor at the following institutions:

Music Academy – PCMC, Pimpri-Chinchwad Municipal Corporation
Heritage Art & Music Academy

Awards 
SANGEET NATAK AKADEMI AWARD AKADEMI PURASKAR for 2020 
Senior Fellowship 2015 from Ministry of Culture, Government of India.
Chitrakarmi Award 2017
Maharashtra State Dr. Babasaheb Ambedkar Dalit Mitra Award 2010
Singar Mani Award.
Maharashtra Rajya Sanskrutik Puraskar – Maharashtra State Cultural Award 2004.  The Award carried a cash prize of Rs.25,000.
Balgandharva Award by PMC(Pune Municipal Corporation), Nehru Award
Limca Book of Records – listed in Limca Book of Records for teaching oldest student aged 76 years.
Pune Navratri Mahotsav Awards (Shri Lakshmimata Kala Sanskruti)
Salaam Pune Award 2015

Books and DVD 

Book
Nritya Samrat Pt. Birju Maharaj (Language: Hindi/English)  2021 

Nritya Samrat Pt. Birju Maharaj, begins with messages by Dr. Sonal Mansingh and Dr. Padma Subrahmanyam, both legends in their respective fields of dance. Essays included in the book are by celebrated national and international artists, a list that reads like a who's who of the performing arts world.

Kathak Samrat – Birju Maharaj (Language: Marathi) 
The book is recommended by Pune University and Tilak Maharashtra University.
The book highlights the multifarious personality of Padma Vibhushan Pt. Birju Maharaj. The book was inaugurated in 2006 by Pt. Birju Maharaj himself at a celebratory function at Nigdi.
 Encyclopaedic Profile of Indian Tribes
Dr. Kapote has co- written the first chapter titled An Introduction to Tribal Dances of India.

DVD
"Shiv Ram Shyam", Kathak style choreography has been arranged by Dr. Kapote in this DVD.  This DVD has been released by Fountain Music Company. Ref number FMV 298.  Additionally,  Dr. Kapote has presented a Kathak style performance on Shiva bhajan in this VCD.

Syllabus 

Dr. Kapote has prepared a Kathak classical dance examination syllabus for Kathak certification and diploma levels. This syllabus has received recognition by Maharashtra State Government for Kathak Classical Dance examinations.

Proficient students who get certified by Nandkishore Cultural Society can avail of extra marks for their HSc (10th standard examinations) throughout Maharashtra. Students can earn up to 15 marks extra upon completion of 5 Kathak levels and up to 10 marks extra upon completion of 3 Kathak levels.

Choreographies & Dance Drama 

Choreographies & Dance Dramas as follows:
'Mahamanav' based on the life of Dr. Babasaheb Ambedkar and was telecast by Mumbai Doordarshan as it created a great impact by spreading the message of Dr. Ambedkar. The cast included 70 performing artists from the age group of 4 – 80 years.
'Mrutyunjay Mahaveer' based on Jain dharma and life of Lord Mahaveer.
'Mahakaleshwar Shiva' based on navarasa (9 Aesthetics)
'Narvar Krishna Saman' based on Bal Gandharva's Marathi language play ‘Natya Sangeet’.

Films 

Dr. Pt. Nandkishore Kapote has choreographed dance sequences for a number of films.

He Geet Jeevanache, famous Marathi language film directed by Shri Ram Gabale with music direction by Pt. Hridaynath Mangeshkar.
Vardhaman Mahaveer, under banner of Bharat Sudhar Films: Proprietor- Dr Prakash B Katariya, Director- Rajesh Chandrakant Limkar, Music Director- Dr. Ashok Patki

Kapote was felicitated with the Chitrakarmi Award 2017  for contribution to Marathi Film Industry. (See Awards section for details)

Performances 

Dr. Kapote's dance career covers a number of National and International performances. A few of his performances are mentioned below:

National Programme of Dance: A Grade artist of Delhi Doordarshan and has performed on national television's 'National Programme of Dance' multiple times.
Ballet Productions produced by Pt. Birju Maharaj. Performed in numerous ballets such as: Katha Raghunathki, Hori Dhoom Machai, Roopmati-Baz Bahadur, Habba Khatun & Krishnayan.
Tributes for Mata Amritanandamayi Numerous performances in honour of Amma's arrival to Pune
ICCR (Indian Council of Cultural Relations, Delhi) has catalogued his performances.  This performance on the repository, was recorded in 1991–92 at the Bal Gandharva Ranga Mandir, Pune. The 52 minute program includes ‘Vishnu Vandana’, ‘Draupadi Vastra Haran’, ‘Bhajan’ and a Tarana. Accompanying Tabla player is Padma Shri recipient Vijay Ghate.

International Performances 

Internationally acclaimed dance performer, Kapote, has presented Kathak performances in the following countries:

Russia: (along with troupe organized by Guru Padma Shri Shovana Narayan)
Russia: (along with his Guru Padma Vibhushan Pt. Birju Maharaj)
United States of America (along with his Guru Padma Vibhushan Pt. Birju Maharaj)
Japan
Malaysia
Thailand
Holland (along with troupe organized by Guru Padma Shri Shovana Narayan)
Kuwait (along with troupe organized by Guru Padma Bhushan Uma Sharma)

Others 
International Dance Day Celebrations 29 April.
Dr. Kapote through his organization ‘Nandkishore Cultural Society’ along with his organization that promotes the cause of artists- ‘Akhil Bharatiya Shastriya Nritya Parishad’, celebrates Dance Day every year, thereby promoting dance artists in Pune. Dance Day
established in 1982 is on 29 April each year and is promoted by the International Dance Council. The International Dance Council (CID -Conseil International de la Danse)  is the official organization for all forms of dance in all countries of the world.  CID was founded in 1973 within the UNESCO headquarters in Paris, where it is based.  2019 poster information for dance day is on the CID website.

Dance Tribute for Shri Satya Saibaba.
Dr. Kapote said he has never missed performing a bhajan on Thursday as a prayer to Baba and would continue to do so.

References

External links 
 Dr.pdt.NANDKISHORE KAPOTE,Kathak Exponent,Kathak Dancer,Kathak Guru and Choreography

Pune
People from Pune by occupation
Kathak exponents
Living people
1956 births
Dancers from Maharashtra
Recipients of the Sangeet Natak Akademi Award